The SURVIVE Group is a UK based consortium of private and public sector organisations concerned primarily with road safety. SURVIVE stands for Safe Use of Roadside Verges in Vehicular Emergencies

History and operations
The Survive Group was created by firms in the UK vehicle breakdown recovery industry in 1998 after the events following up to the deaths of six roadside operators working with car breakdowns. The industry was joined soon thereafter by the Highways Agency and the Association of Chief Police Officers in what become known as The Survive Group.
The member organisations believe that it is necessary to create public awareness about safety in breakdown conditions on the hard shoulder for both drivers and workers, and that creating a public awareness organisation would best serve this purpose.

Working Groups

The Survive Group is composed of the Survive Executive and 4 Working Groups. The Survive Executive is the body that sets strategic direction for the consortium.

Working Group 1
This group is concerned primarily with protocols and best practices on the road. Members include such prominent organisations as the Association of Chief Police Officers, the AA and RAC. This working group lays emphasis on learning from accidents and near-misses. Data is shared across the group in order to promulgate instructions and operating standards. A Best Practices Guidelines document is in progress and will be published on the Survive Group’s website.

Working Group 2
The second working group deals with industry standards and their implementation. A major achievement of this working group has been the PAS 43:2008 document, which provides guidelines for attending car breakdowns.

Working Group 3
The third working group deals with roadside operator conspicuity and visibility. Poor visibility can be a safety hazard in the work environment, and therefore this working group makes the necessary recommendations to make roadside operators more visible and safe.
Key issues addressed by the Group include traffic officers’ use of safety red lights and the introduction of more stable arrow signs that are able to withstand extreme weather conditions.

Working Group 4
The fourth working group manages communications between Survive Group’s working groups as well as between the organisation, its stakeholders and the general public.

Members Organisations

The Survive Group is composed of the following organisations. These include private and public sector organisations.

 Association of Chief Police Officers
 The Automobile Association 	
 Green Flag
 Highways Agency
 RAC Motoring Services
 Road Haulage Association – Rescue Recovery Group	
 Vehicle and Operator Services Agency
 Association of British Certification Bodies	
 Association of British Insurers	
 Association of Vehicle Recovery Operators	
 AXA Assistance	
 Britannia Rescue	
 Europe-Assistance Holdings Limited	
 Habilis Health and Safety Solutions Limited	
 Institute of Vehicle Recovery 	
 Allianz Partners UK	
 National Tyre Distributors Association	
 Recovery Equipment Manufacturers and Suppliers Association	
 Retail Motor Industry Federation
 Road Maintenance Contractors
 Home Office Scientific Development Branch	
 Transport Research Laboratory

See also
 Highways Agency

External links
 Official website

Transport organisations based in the United Kingdom